Luc Suykerbuyk (born 12 February 1964) is a Dutch former professional road cyclist.

Major results

1985
 1st Stage 5 Tour de Liège
1986
 1st  Overall Cinturón a Mallorca
1st Prologue
1988
 2nd Overall Tour of the Basque Country
1st Stage 3
1989
 3rd Overall Vuelta a Castilla y León
 6th Overall Vuelta a Andalucía
 10th Overall Vuelta a España
1st Stage 6
1990
 1st Stage 4 Vuelta a Murcia
 3rd Overall Route du Sud
 8th Overall Grand Prix du Midi Libre

References

External links

1964 births
Living people
Dutch male cyclists
Sportspeople from Roosendaal
Dutch Vuelta a España stage winners
Cyclists from North Brabant